The 1940 Auckland Rugby League season was its 32nd.

Richmond Rovers won the Fox Memorial Shield for the 4th time after previously winning in 1934, 1935, and 1937. They finished the season with a 12 win, 1 draw, 3 loss record and were 3 points ahead of runner up North Shore Albions, with Mount Albert United in 3rd. Papakura struggled through much of the competition only managing 1 win. They, like many teams had lost playing members to the war effort and were unable to field a reserve grade side.

Richmond Rovers also won the Roope Rooster knockout competition when they beat Ponsonby United 31–7 in the final. Richmond had made the final by defeating a surprise Papakura side who had beaten Otahuhu Rovers and Manukau on their way to the semi final. While Ponsonby had thrashed Mount Albert 41–13 in their semi final. After being knocked out of the Roope Rooster, Manukau managed to win the Phelan Shield knockout competition when they defeated Mount Albert 20–14 in the final.

In the Stormont Shield, champion of champions match North Shore Albions beat Richmond 15–10. North Shore had qualified for the match by virtue of the fact that they had finished runner up in the championship. Typically the match would be played between the winner of the championship and the winner of the Roope Rooster. But with Richmond winning both trophies the long standing rule was that the championship runner up would play in the match in that eventuality.

Richmond also won the reserve grade championship (Norton Cup) ahead of Mount Albert. There was very poor coverage of the reserve grade competition and as such a large number of results were not reported and towards the later part of the season match fixtures were not even being published in either The New Zealand Herald or the Auckland Star. The competition only featured seven of the eight 1st grade senior sides with Papakura not involved. Otahuhu Rovers won the Senior B championship (Sharman Cup) once again. This competition was also very poorly reported though most of Otahuhu's matches did at least have the score reported.

Owing to the war there were very few representative fixtures. The majority involved matches between Auckland (Tamaki) Māori and Pakehā sides with Auckland Māori playing one match at Davies Park in Huntly against South Auckland (Waikato). At the conclusion of the season a charity type fixture was played between the Auckland Veterans and the South Auckland veterans. Craddock Dufty kicked 5 conversions for the Auckland side in a 31–18 win.

Auckland Rugby League News

Agreement to commence season with war underway
On 14 February all “units of the Auckland Rugby League… adopted a resolution to carry on football as usual, with the proviso that, if it was necessary to curtail activities, the league would loyally support any government action in this direction”. The difficulties that the league would likely face were discussed at length and some pointed “to the request of Empire authorities that sport should be carried on as normally as possible, given the consensus of opinion being that, by providing the usual facilities for play, the game would be keeping men fit for national emergency”. It was also noted that as all clubs had already lost players to the war effort from the senior and lower grades. The possibility was also suggested of amalgamating clubs to maintain the strength of the competition. The annual report showed that £1537 16s 4d was transferred to the appropriation account. The balance-sheet showed that the assets of the league totaled £11,430 which was an increase of £100 on the previous year.

At its 30th annual meeting on 27 March tribute was paid to “the memory of the Rt. Hon. M.J. Savage” and they also “passed a motion of regret at the passing of two supporters, Mr. George Seagar, and international player in his day, and Mr. O. Blackwood”. The board added the name of Mr. W.J. Hammill to the honours board after a suggestion by Mr. E.G. Phelan. Phelan’s name was also subsequently added. Officers were elected as follows: Patron, Mr. J.B. Donald; vice patron, Mr. J.F.W. Dickson; president, Mr. John A. Lee, M.P.; vice presidents, same as last year, with the name of Mr. B. Brigham president of Mount Albert, added: trustees, Messrs. A. Stormont, E.J. Phelan and G. Grey Campbell; junior board chairman, Mr. E. Chapman; club delegates to control board, Messrs. T. Davis, J.W. Probert, T.H.V. Wilson and a member to be appointed, auditor, Mr. R.A. Spinley, F.P.A. (NZ); hon. solicitor, Mr. H.M. Rogerson; junior board secretary, Mr. W.F. Clarke; delegate to Referees’ Appointment Board, Mr. A.C. Gallagher (T. Davis deputy); hon. physicians, Drs. M.G. Pezaro, S. Morris, K.H. Holdgate, J.N. Waddell, G.W. Lock, H. Burrell and W. Bridgman, hon. masseur, Mr. F. Flanagan. Then at the subsequent meeting of the board of control Messrs. Ivan Culpan and J.E. Knowling were reappointed hon. secretary and treasurer respectively, with Mr. R. Doble delegate to the New Zealand Rugby League and also press steward. Messrs. Percy Rogers, A.C. Gallagher and G. Grey Campbell were appointed to the Referees’ Appointment Board), and Messrs. T. Hill and E. Chapman (timekeepers). South Auckland (Waikato) had also applied to enter a team in the Auckland senior competition but the board “decided that owing to various difficulties revealed in consideration of the matter…it could not at present be approved”. It was intended to open the season with preliminary rounds of senior play on 6 and 13 April.

At their meeting on 3 April they welcomed new members onto the board, namely Jim Clark, who was a former New Zealand, Auckland, and Ponsonby player and long time official for the Otahuhu club, and Mr. F.M.V. Wilson, who was a former trustee and chairman at Newton Rangers.

Senior grade eligibility
The ARL senior board proposed to extend “during the duration of the war, the limit of three days to six in the case of juniors being tried out for senior teams before such players are regraded as seniors” however this was strongly opposed by the junior board. The “opinion was expressed that the change would be too detrimental to junior clubs and organisations”. The junior board members were unanimous “that the change would be too drastic, as well as unnecessary, because the quality of a trialist should be measured in three games”. At the 25 April meeting the difficultly that some clubs were experiencing in maintaining full playing strength due to players enlisting in the military forces was discussed. It was “decided that for the duration of the war the rule be waived regarding the nomination of senior reserve and senior B teams”. As teams had to field senior reserve grade teams to qualify to play in the senior grade chairman G Grey Campbell said “It is going to be difficult to keep the senior A teams up to full strength… and as time goes on reserve grade players will be moved up to fill vacancies. In the circumstances the requirements of senior status cannot be enforced”.

Scrum rules
After several weeks where scrums were an issue during matches it was decided to endeavour to improve them. Chairman Campbell “expressed approval of the suggestion by Mr. Jim Clark regarding the desirability of better understanding on the scrum formation. He said that there was need for improvement in the method of hooking to open up the game. It was decided to hold a conference next week with Messrs. Archie Ferguson, representing the New Zealand Referees’ Association, and Les Bull, chairman of the Auckland Referees’ Association, and Percy Rogers and A.C. Gallagher, of the appointments board”. It was decided that the ball needed to enter the scrum 3 feet and land before players could hook for the ball.

Resignation of Mr. D. Wilkie
On 28 February Mr. D. Wilkie submitted his resignation. He was chairman of the junior control board, and had been on the committee for seven years. He was moving to Ōpōtiki for business reasons.

Papakura army camp teams
At the board of control meeting on 3 April it was indicated that Papakura Camp teams would most likely be “officially represented in the Auckland Rugby League senior competition”. Captain T.P. Laffey who was the sports organiser of the camp was in attendance at the meeting and he pointed out “that football and other sports were an important integral part of soldier training and it was hoped that the board would admit one or two representative teams in the Auckland league senior competitions”. Chairman Campbell, with other members in agreement, “assured Captain Laffey that the league would welcome teams”. It was also decided that soldiers in uniform “for active service” would be admitted free to Carlaw Park during the season.

Carlaw Park military activities
The Auckland Rugby League gave permission for Carlaw Park to be used full time by the military for gatherings and training activities starting in September however they were still able to use it for rugby league activities on Saturday’s until the end of the season.

Fred Tottey
Fred Tottey had moved to New Zealand from Australia and sought to play for Mount Albert. However he had still been under contract with his English club (Halifax) and was not allowed to register in New Zealand without a clearance being granted. As a result he only played two preseason matches and then later registered with rugby, playing a few matches for the Grammar club before returning to Australia.

Weight increase for junior grades
On 23 April the junior control board granted permission “to raise the weights on all weighted grades by 4lb, the usual allowances to apply. The weighing committee reported that boys were finding difficulty in getting down to the present scale”.

Auckland representative team
At the 10 April board meeting “acting on the club nomination, a ballot resulted in the election of Messrs. H. (Hec) Brisbane, W. E. (Bill) Cloke, and A. J. (Dougie) McGregor as Auckland senior selectors for the season. McGregor was replacing Bert Avery who had been selector along with Brisbane and Cloke previously.

Obituary

James Rukutai
On 11 January Puhipi James Rukutai died suddenly at his daughters home in Onehunga. He was originally from Kawhia, and a member of the Ngāti Hikairo and Ngāti Hourua tribes. He was educated at St Stephens College. He worked as a miner at Waihi and while there played for the Goldfields rugby team. After moving “to Auckland he became established as a native interpreter, particularly in the Supreme Court, and was advisor in legal matters to a wide circle of his people”. He was “a vigorous supporter of league football, and was a member of one of the representative teams that visited Australia”. Rukutai played for City Rovers in 1910 and 1911 before transferring to the Manukau club for 2 seasons. He later moved back to his former City side from 1913 to 1918 before playing a final season with Māngere United in 1924. Rukutai made 9 appearances for New Zealand Māori in 1909, 18 for Auckland from 1911 to 1918, and 23 for New Zealand from 1911 to 1921. He also coached the 1921 New Zealand team on their tour and coached the New Zealand Māori side from 1922 to 1937. He was also involved in the Auckland Lawn Tennis Association and the Campbell Park Tennis Club. The minor premiership Rukutai Shield was named in his honour and is still competed for today. His funeral was held at the St. James’ Māori cemetery at Māngere. Tawauwau Tapihana and Tema Tewene spoke at his daughters house, paying “tribute to the memory of the departed Rangatira”. The graveside services were conducted by Revs. Tokorau Poihipi and E. Pepemana, and Mr. G. Harrison, Worshipful Master of Lodge Manukau, No. 24, of which Mr. Rukutai was a highly respected officer”. Noted rugby league officials in attendance included the president of New Zealand Rugby League, Mr. J.A. Redwood, and the chairman and deputy chairman of the Auckland Rugby League, Messrs, G. Grey Campbell and E.J. Phelan respectively. The Mayor of Onehunga, Mr. Archer Garside was also present. At a meeting for the Auckland Rugby League on 3 April Mr. H. Walmsley was thanked for “the offer of a special trophy to commemorate the late Mr. James Rukutai”. On 22 May the league read a written submission by a supporter, Mr. D. Philburn that the “Rukutai Trophy” be awarded to the senior team that is leading at the end of the first round in the championship. At the same meeting it was reported that Māori supporters, through Steve Watene “were contributing a sum towards a further special memorial to Mr. J. Rukutai”. With the ARL board subsidising the fund. On 10 July Mr. W.E. Dervan presented the league with a “presentation photograph” of Rukutai. North Shore were the inaugural winners of the Rukutai Shield when they finished the first round with 14 competition points from 7 wins and a loss ahead of Richmond and Manukau who both had 11 competition points. On 23 October a memorial tablet was unveiled in Rukutai’s memory by Ted Phelan. The tablet was inscribed with the words “Ake Ake Kia Pono”.

William Winter
William Wilfred Winter died aged 55 on 6 June. He was a foundation member of Newton Rangers playing for them in 1909 and 1910. He “was a contractor by trade and was responsible for the early laying out of Carlaw Park when that site was a Chinamen’s garden”. He was also on the Ponsonby United committee for several years in the mid 1920s.

Senior first grade competitions

Preliminary rounds

Preliminary round 1
 Roy Mansill debuted for Mount Albert. He was the Auckland amateur sprint champion and the son of Arthur Mansill who played a generation earlier for Newton Rangers. Roy enlisted in the NZ air force as a pilot and was killed on a training flight at RNZAF Base Ohakea in 1945.  In the match between Richmond and Marist, Frank Furnell broke his left arm and was taken by ambulance to Auckland Hospital. His arm was set and he was later discharged. Desmond Bilkey of the Papakura side scored the first try of the season and after the match was congratulated by chairman Campbell. Bilkey had recently become the leading half mile runner at the Papakura Athletic Club which was also based at Prince Edward Park in Papakura as was the rugby league club. He enlisted shortly after this photo was taken and went to war. He was wounded in 1945 before returning to New Zealand.

Preliminary round 2

Fox Memorial standings
{|
|-
|

Fox Memorial results

Round 1

Round 2

Round 3

Round 4
In the City v Marist game Gordon Crocker of Marist fractured his right forearm and was taken to hospital. Midway through the second half in the match between Newton and Papakura, Harold Milliken of the Papakura side was ordered off. The ARL control board met in committee and decided to stand him down for two playing Saturday’s. Edgar Tredrea scored 2 tries for Newton after being promoted to the senior side. He was the brother of Frank Tredrea, a champion cyclist who went on to represent New Zealand at the 1950 British Empire Games in Auckland.

Round 5
In the match between Mount Albert and Marist, Shadbolt and McLeod were both ordered off near the end of the game. During the week they were severely cautioned by the control board. (G.D.) Flanagan, the hooker for Ponsonby was sent off in their match with Manukau for lifting in the scrums. The referee had been heard by spectators warning Flanagan at the first scrum of the match for lifting, and he also discussed the issue with the Ponsonby captain, intimating “that Flanagan would have to be moved from the position of hooker”. A short time later he “was ordered by the referee to play second row of the pack, an action not considered warranted by members of the Ponsonby side”. He later moved to the prop position and whilst there the referee “decided to order him off”. After the match Flanagan was interviewed and “expressed astonishment at the referee’s action. He stated that, during his 12 years’ experience in club and representative play, his style of hooking had never been questioned”. Other officials who were present refused to give comment on the incident until the referee had given his report to the control board. Flanagan was away on business during the week and so was told to appear before the board a week later. In the meantime the referee said that he had sent him off for repeatedly kicking the ball out of the scrum.

Round 6
The match between Newton and Mount Albert was played on 25 May as part of a Gala to raise money for the Sick and Wounded Soldiers’ Campaign. The gala featured the senior league match, midget league games, a representative football match, and a relay race between rugby league and football senior players. The rugby league relay team was Roy Nurse (Ponsonby), Cheator (North Shore), Jack Brodrick (Manukau), and F Gould (city), while the football team was L Needham, G Hutchinson, A Masters, and G Robinson. The football side won the relay race after “the final runner for the rugby league team failed to accept the baton at a stage when a thrilling finish seemed likely”. The football match was drawn between Auckland and ‘The Rest’. Remarkably when the sixth round was complete Ponsonby had still not registered a try through 5 matches (they had a bye in round 1).

Round 7

Round 8

Round 9
J Marsh of Manukau was sent off in their match with North Shore but the referee did not submit a report and so the case lapsed enabling Marsh to play the following week.

Round 10
With Papakura trailing Richmond 32–2 with 14 minutes their captain Harold Milliken took his side from the field in protest at a refereeing decision by O Chalmers. The incident occurred just after the referee awarded a try to Richmond. After the match Milliken and the referee refused to make a statement but “several members of the Papakura team said that their action had been precipitated by the referee’s decisions, with which they disagreed”.
 The control board met on 10 July to discuss the case and met in committee. It was reported later that the club had apologised for its teams actions and the apology was accepted by the board.

Round 11
Ponsonby's win over Papakura was their 200th win in first grade matches stretching back to the inaugural season in 1910. They were the first team to achieve this feat.

Round 12
In the match between Richmond and North Shore, Charles Webb (Richmond) broke his jaw. He had played on after receiving the injury and was taken to hospital after the match. He had received “a severe blow to the face when endeavouring to tackle an opponent. He appeared slightly dazed for a few seconds, but continued playing throughout the game… at the conclusion of the match he collapsed in the dressing room and an examination revealed a badly fractured jaw”. Bruce Donaldson returned from his dislocated elbow injury received in the match between Auckland Pakehā and Auckland Māori to replace Verdun Scott in the North Shore side who had sprained his ankle after falling heavily in a midweek game of basketball at the Y.M.C.A.

Round 13
In the City-Marist match the referee G Kelly received a kick and play had to be stopped for him to receive treatment. In the same match R.L. Haslam made a return to the Marist side after not having played for years. He had been an Auckland rugby representative who had played against England in 1930. Papakura began their match with Newton short of players and Francis filled in.

Round 14

Round 15
It was reported in the Auckland Star that Verdun Scott was returning from injury however they contradicted their earlier report that said he had received his injury playing basketball at the YMCA, and said that his injury had occurred playing table tennis. His cousin, Len Scott came out of retirement to assist the side for the match.

Round 16

Round 17
Len Jordan who would later represent New Zealand made his debut for Ponsonby after transferring from Northcote’s senior B side. In the same match former international Brian Riley made his first appearance of the season. The match between Mount Albert and Papakura did not have any point scorers attributed. There was a list published of point scorers to this point of the season which indicated Bert Leatherbarrow had 65 points from 15 tries and 10 goals which suggested that he must have scored 2 tries and kicked 6 goals in the match. Papakura had many injuries and had to play the second half with just 11 players at which time the score was 29–22.

Round 18
Somewhat confusingly the ARL originally decided to just play the Mount Albert – Richmond game in round 18. Richmond had already secured the title but the runner up needed to be decided in the event of Richmond also winning the Roope Rooster as this would mean the Stormont Shield would need to be played against the genuine second place getter. Mount Albert complicated matters by upsetting Richmond which then tied them for second with North Shore. In order to make it fair North Shore then played their round 18 match 2 weeks later against Newton at the Devonport Domain. They won 33–15 to finish runner up on their own. With little riding on the game for Newton they fielded several 3rd grade players. Ultimately Richmond did indeed win the Roope Rooster meaning they played North Shore in the Stormont Shield with the Devonport based side winning.

Roope Rooster
Otahuhu United, who had won the Senior B competition were given permission to play in the Roope Rooster competition. They were defeated by Papakura in the first round by 23 points to 9.

Round 1

Round 2
In the match between Papakura and Manukau, Selwyn Jackson made his debut for Manukau. He was a Hawkes Bay rugby representative and had gone on the 1938 tour of Fiji with New Zealand Māori. Bob Banham played his last match for Mount Albert before returning to Australia.

Semi final

Semi final

Final

Phelan Shield

Round 1

Round 2

Round 3
W Mataira was sent off for City in their match with Papakura.

Semi final

Final
Following the Phelan Shield final Bert Leatherbarrow announced that he was retiring. An article in the Auckland Star said “he made a start with football when seven years of age and was then goalkeeper for the North Shore fifth grade soccer football team. In his school days at Devonport he played rugby, and he also played rugby in North Auckland and Taranaki. Then he played league in the North Shore junior grades”. Leatherbarrow was selected in the New Zealand side in 1939.

Stormont Shield

Final

Top try scorers and point scorers

Senior reserve competitions
A huge number of matches in the reserve grade competition were neither listed in the newspaper nor had their result reported. As such the records are very incomplete. It wasn’t until mid September that it was reported that Richmond had won the reserve grade competition. Most teams would have played approximately 11 games but the majority had less than half their scores reported. Papakura did not field a reserve grade team most likely due to the effect of World War 2 on playing numbers.

Norton Cup standings
{|
|-
|

Norton Cup results

Stallard Cup (knockout competition)
Several of the fixtures were not reported in the newspapers including the final. The knockout competition was between reserve grade sides and the senior B teams.

Senior B grade competitions

Sharman Cup standings
{|
|-
|

Sharman Cup results
R.V. withdrew their senior B team after the first round. It is unlikely that they played their opening match against Northcote. There we no fixtures or results recorded in round 9.

Knockout competition
In recent seasons when the senior B championship had concluded a 'knockout' competition was held which was run more as a full round robin than a knockout. It featured Otahuhu United, Point Chevalier, Northcote & Birkenhead Ramblers, and Ellerslie United. The competition was named "Walmesley Shield" in previous seasons but the name was not used in 1940. Otahuhu United won after beating their other 3 opponents over consecutive weekends.

Knockout results

Other club matches and lower grades

Lower grade clubs
The Intermediate Primary Schools competition was reportedly won by Newton however later in the year it was reported that Marist beat R.V. by 5 points to 3 which drew the two teams level in the competition and they therefore shared the title however there was no Marist team competing in the grade so it is probably in error and for a different grade or competition. It was also reported that Mount Albert beat Avondale 16–0 in the Intermediate grade final though this was likely for the A section winner. It is possible that Mount Albert was defeated by Newton in a playoff between the winners of the two sections.

Grades were made of the following teams with the winning team in bold:
Third Grade: Avondale, City Rovers, Glenora, Marist Old Boys, Mount Albert United, Newton Rangers, Otahuhu United, Papakura, Point Chevalier, Ponsonby United, R.V., Richmond Rovers
Fourth Grade Gillett Cup: Avondale, City Rovers, Ellerslie, Glenora, Green Lane, Newmarket, North Shore Albions, Otahuhu United, Papakura, Point Chevalier, Richmond Rovers
Fifth Grade: City Rovers, Ellerslie United, Manukau, Mount Albert United, Newmarket, Northcote & Birkenhead Ramblers, Otahuhu United, Ponsonby United, Richmond Rovers
Sixth Grade: City Rovers, Mount Albert United, Newton Rangers, Otahuhu United, Papakura Point Chevalier
Seventh Grade: Ellerslie United, Otahuhu United, Papakura, Richmond Rovers
Schoolboys
Senior (Lou Rout trophy): Avondale, Ellerslie, Green Lane, Manukau, Newton, North Shore, Northcote, Point Chevalier, Ponsonby, Richmond
Intermediate (Newport and Eccles Memorial Shield): A Section – Avondale, Glenora, Mount Albert, Point Chevalier, Richmond; B Section – Ellerslie, Green Lane, Marist, Newton, Ponsonby, R.V.
Junior: Glenora, Green Lane, Manukau, Newmarket, North Shore, Northcote, Point Chevalier, Ponsonby, St Patricks
Seven-a-side: Manukau, Marist, Newton, North Shore, Papakura, Ponsonby, Richmond

Other senior club matches

Manukau v Huntly
On 10 August when Manukau had a bye in the Fox Memorial Shield competition they arranged a friendly match with Huntly at Waikaraka Park in Onehunga. The visitors won 23 points to 13.

Challenge Match
On 24 August a match was played between Richmond, the winner of the Auckland club championship and the winner of the Waikato club championship, Huntly South.

North Shore v Huntly
North Shore travelled to Huntly to play the local side on 7 September. Only the score was reported though it was noted that the Huntly side was similar to the one which had defeated Richmond two weeks earlier.

Stratford v City
In September City travelled to Stratford with their senior team and their reserve side. The senior side lost to Stratford 9–5.

Representative fixtures

Auckland Māori v South Auckland (Waikato)
Ernie Asher was appointed the coach of the Māori side.

Auckland Māori v Auckland Pākehā (James Carlaw Memorial Trophy)
The match between Auckland Māori and Pākehā was originally scheduled to be played on 1 June to celebrate Kings Birthday however due to war being well underway his birthday was not being officially celebrated so it was thought inappropriate to play the match as part of the ‘non existent’ celebrations. Bruce Donaldson dislocated his elbow during the match and missed several club games.

Auckland Māori v Pākehā

Auckland Veterans v South Auckland Veterans (Les Lees Cup)

Tāmaki (Auckland Māori) representative matches played and scoring

Auckland Pākehā representative matches played and scoring

Auckland Schoolboys Team
In August an Auckland schoolboys representative side was selected to travel to New Plymouth to play a Taranaki team. They left by train on 22 August and played their match on Saturday, the 23rd. Auckland won the match 39 points to 3. The team selected was Glean (Ellerslie, Keene, Belsham, Walker (Newton), Purvan (Ponsonby), Robinson, Watson, Clarke, Reeve, Flanagan (Richmond), Smith (North Shore), Robinson (Northcote), and Reilly (Green Lane) with two more to be chosen at a later date (the team had been named on 15 August). L Rout and J Silva were named as the team managers to accompany them on the tour.

Another schoolboys side was selected to play a match against 'The Rest' on 19 October as a curtain-raiser to the Auckland Veterans v South Auckland Veterans side. The result was not reported.

Third Grade representative teams
On 31 August a 3rd grade representative match was played at Carlaw Park between a suburban 3rd grade representative side and a town representative side. It was a curtain-raiser to the Auckland Māori v Auckland Pakehā match. The result was not reported.

The teams were as follows; 
Town: Bob Scott, B. Thomas, R.D. Elliot (Ponsonby), K.J. Hagen, H.L. Burton, J. Brady (Newton), C.D. Lorimer, E. McCarthy, J. Brown, H. Phillips, F.R. Williams, A.R. Turner, P.M. Virtue (Richmond), E.H. James, E. Sexton, A.J.B. Donovan (Marist), W. Burgoyne, H. Gordon, S.W. Trainer (City).

Suburban: L. Davis, L. Meyer, W.J. McGuigan (Point Chevalier), L.R. Russer, O. Wilson (Glenora), S.T. Taylor, S. Hetherington, K.W. Morrison, W.J. Green (Mount Albert), K. Simons, A.W. McManus, J. Mullins, C. Duane, R. Martin, B.G. McManus (Otahuhu), A.B. Dormer, L.A. Weigel (Avondale).

Annual General Meetings and Club News

Auckland Rugby League Junior Management Committee
On 19 March the junior management held their annual meeting. Their report stated that over 1000 players participated in the various grades. Regret was expressed at the departure of Mr. D. Wilkie. By postal ballot from the clubs the following committee was elected: executive committee: Messrs. E. Chapman, C. Howe, I. Stonex, C. Hopkinson, M.E. McNamara, T. Carey, T. McIntosh and G. Batchelor. There was a tie for ninth which required the names of three candidates to be resubmitted. Mr. J. Short was re-elected delegate of the Referees’ Association. At their meeting on 2 April the appointment of Mr. E. Chapman was confirmed, he was succeeding Mr. D. Wilkie. Mr. C. Howe was elected deputy, and Mr. Ivan Stonex was grounds allocator and assistant secretary. The ninth member elected after the further ballot was Mr. W. Berger.

Auckland Rugby League Primary School Management Committee
In October L Rout, secretary of the primary school boys committee was presented with a blazer, fountain pen, and pencil in recognition of his work for ten years. Chairman of the Auckland Rugby League, Campbell paid tribute to his work and said “the success of the boys competition was due to the secretary’s administration.

Auckland Rugby League Referees Association
They held their annual meeting on 4 March with Mr. Les E. Bull presiding. The report presented said that “the 1939 season was successful, and the number of new members indicated the flourishing state of the association, the total active membership being 56”. The following officers were elected:- President, Mr. Les Bull; vice-president, Mr. J. McCowatt; senior delegate, Mr. William Mincham; junior, Mr. J. Short; schoolboys, Mr. G. Kelly; New Zealand Association, Mr. Les Bull; secretary, Mr. T.E. Skinner; treasurer, Mr. A. Chapman; critic, Mr. A. Sanders; appointment board appointee, Mr. Percy Rogers; examination committee, Messrs. M. Renton and A Brady; executive, Messrs. Billman, Maurice Wetherill, and R. Otto. At their meeting on 9 April it was decided to instruct “referees to fully penalise late tacking”… “which was unnecessarily the cause of too much injury”. At the same meeting the resignations of Messrs. A.G. Campney and R.L. Marrick “were received with regret”. On 22 April “the resignation of Mr. A. Kinnaird was received with regret”.

Avondale League Football Club
R. Dormer of the Avondale club won a gold medal presented by Mr. J. F. W. Dickson at the final control board meeting of the year on 23 October for being the best conducted junior player.

City Rovers Football Club
They began their senior and senior reserve grade practices on the night of 26 March at Carlaw Park. On 1 September they held a special meeting to discuss their proposed trip to Stratford on 7 September. Their annual picnic was held at Redwood Park in Swanson on 3 November. At the picnic a presentation of a clock was made to Ernie Asher for his 31 years of service to the club.

Ellerslie United League Football Club
In April Ellerslie protested against the City Rovers club in playing W. Clarke against Manukau in round 1 of the championship without obtaining permission from Ellerslie. Chairman Campbell said that City had applied just prior to the game starting and it was granted pending confirmation at the first meeting following the match. On 1 May the Ellerslie club sent a deputation to the control board meeting asking for support “in the matter of contribution to the borough’s effort to raise funds for the erection of an ambulance room on” the ground they used. “Mr. J. McInnarney appealed for the staging of a senior match at Ellerslie later in the season. The chairman after discussion with the board recognised the work of the St John Ambulance Association and it was agreed to arrange a fixture”.

Glenora Rugby League Football Club
Glenora fielded a team in the 4th grade, along with a side in the intermediate primary schools and junior primary schools competitions.

Manukau Rugby League Club
On 9 April at the ARL junior management meeting the Manukau club notified the league that their junior delegate was Mr. L.G. Healey. On 22 May the control board granted the Manukau club permission to stage their match with Papakura at Waikaraka Park in aid of the Onehunga Patriotic Committee. Towards the end of the season Tapihana Paraire Paikea played a few matches for the Manukau senior side. In 1943 he succeeded his father who had died, as the winner of the Northern Maori electorate.

Marist Brothers Old Boys League Football Club
At their annual meeting in March they stood in silence to remember Mr. J. McSweeney and Jim Rukutai who had both passed away recently. Their annual report congratulated the senior team on winning the Roope Rooster. Officers were elected as follows:- Patron, His Lordship Bishop Liston; president, Mr. Joe Sayegh; vice presidents, all were re-elected, with power to add; secretary, Mr. Jack Kirwan; treasurer, Mr. P. Fletcher; club captain, Mr. F. Webberley; school board, Mr. E.J. Foster; auditors, Messrs. R. Haslam, J. Ball, P. Hughes, W. Maddigan, J. Delihoyde; masseurs, Messrs. J. Duffy, and G. Allen.

Mt. Albert United Rugby League Football Club
At their annual meeting the following officers were elected:- Patron, Mr. Henry Albert Anderson, Mayor of Mount Albert; vice patron, Mr. Arthur Shapton Richards, M.P.; president, Mr. B Brigham; chairman, Mr. R.J. Wilson; secretary and treasurer, Mr. H.G. Shaw; club captain, Mr. L. Pearson; honorary auditor, Mr. S.C. Johnson.

Newton Rangers League Football Club
Their annual meeting was held in late March at the Auckland RL’s board room. Officers were elected as follows:- Patron, Mr. M.J. Hooper; vice patron, Mr. Alan Blakey; president, the Hon. W.E. Parry; club captain, Mr. J. McKinnon; secretary, Mr. J. Gibson; chairman, Mr. G. Steven; committee, Messrs. R. Bell, E. Cowley, J. Davison, I. Railey, R. Anderson, and J.A. Neitch.

North Shore Albions
Allan Seagar coached the senior team.

Northcote and Birkenhead Ramblers Football Club
At the Northcote Borough Council meeting on 26 March an application was received by the league club to use Stafford Park. The council gave permission for the use of the ground from 27 April with the conditions the same as the previous year. At the Northcote Borough Council meeting on 26 June the Northcote club “asked permission to take up a collection in aid of the funds of the Northcote Red Cross branch at a burlesque football match to be played on July 6” at Stafford Park, Northcote. The council granted permission.

Otahuhu Rugby League Football Club
On 22 April the Ōtāhuhu Borough Council met and “on the advice of the legal and finance committee it was resolved to charge the [Otahuhu] league football club 5/ per week during the season for the use of the playing ground in Hutton Street, plus £2 12/ per year for the use of the ground on which the training shed stands”. In the middle of the year the club sent a deputation to the Otahuhu Borough Council meeting complaining of being “charged for use of water for which they had not received an account for seven years”. A member of the council said that they statement should be withdrawn as the council had duplicates of the accounts which proved that the league club had in fact received annual accounts. The council said that they would reconsider the charge of £2 12/ per year for the use of the playing area. Following a meeting of the Otahuhu Borough Council in early July they invited any member of the rugby league club who was a ratepayer in the area to “peruse office documents regarding the letting of Sturges Park to the rugby union. In regard to the water account owing by the [Otahuhu league] club, which they allege went to the sister code, the town clerk stated that carbon copies inspected by the parks committee prove that with one exception accounts were addressed correctly”. The council also decided that as the league club was unable to provide lighting at the ground it was using they would not make any charge when the ground was not in use.

Papakura Rugby League Football Club
On 1 April at the Papakura Borough Council meeting they granted the use of Prince Edward Park to the Papakura Rugby League Club for the season at a rental of £10. The club held their end of year presentations in late October. Mr. Les McVeigh was presiding and presentations were made to three officials. They were Mr. Ron Walsh who was secretary and had recently been appointed to a position in Thames, Mr. R.C. Williams who was being transferred to Whangārei, and Mr. Gordon Wilson who was retiring from the executive position he had held at the club since its inception for business reasons. Each man was presented with an inscribed wristlet watch. Walsh and Williams had “been in office since 1936”.

Point Chevalier League Football Club

Ponsonby United Football Club

Richmond Rovers Football Club
They held their annual meeting in late March with Mr. B.W. Davis presiding. The success of various teams who had won trophies in 1939 was noted. The following officers were elected:- Patron, Mr. J.A. Redwood, sen.; president, Mr. B.W. Davis; secretary and treasurer, Mr. W.R. Dick; club captain, Mr. R. Hyland; schoolboys’ delegate, Mr. E.J. McCarthy; auditor, Mr. J.A. Redwood.

Transfers and registrations
On 10 April an unnamed club sought to register J.A. Flower (Kogorah, New South Wales). He had “signed up with an Auckland club [Ponsonby] in June last year, but had not played”. Another club had inquired as to whether or not it could sign him but the board said that according to the rules he would have to be granted a clearance from Ponsonby or else stand down until June.
 Eventually in July his transfer was approved by the New South Wales Rugby League. The following applications for senior membership were approved:- W. Mataira, E. Estall, P.A. McGurr, L.C. Stevens (City), H.M. Richards, N.C. Bacon (Newton), R. Findlater (City), L.F. Hart (Newton). On 17 April the following transfers were approved:- R.J. Douglas (Manukau to Newton), J.B. Bakalich (Marist to Ponsonby), and E.J. Bovaird (Papakura to Mount Albert). These players were registered:- J.L. Littlewood, J.D. Richardson, L.R. Nepia, F. Swanberg (Ponsonby), L.J. Trumper (Newton), G. Graham (North Shore), J. Hunt (Mount Albert), J. F. Keates (City). On 25 April the following registrations were approved:- P.H. Kelly, E. Eaton, T.E. Appleton (Ponsonby), P. Rei, J. Belmont, E. Tetai (Ponsonby), D. Morris (Newton), J. McArthur, N. Beagley (North Shore), A.C. Miller (Richmond), A. Watkins (City), E.L. Gower, D. Holden, J. Nolan, J. Walters, C. Ahern, J. Quirke (Marist). While the following transfers were granted:- D. Munro (Green Lane to City), G. Brady (Otahuhu to Mount Albert), and H. Johnstone and R. Martin (both Otahuhu to Manukau).

On 1 May the following players were regraded:- T.H. Burgess (Papakura seniors to Otahuhu thirds), R.T. Taylor (Newton seniors to Otahuhu senior B), and A. Legge (City to senior B, and then to third grade subject to approval by the junior board). Clearance were granted for J. O’Brien (North Shore to Western Suburbs, Sydney), A.B. Nathan (Newton Rangers to Central, Wellington). The following players were granted transfers:- G. Crocker, Papakura to Marist Old Boys, D. Brady (Otahuhu senior B to Mount Albert), S.W. Clarke (Ellerslie senior B to City reserves), J McArthur (Ellerslie senior B to North Shore). W. Burgoyne (City), and J. Philpott (Point Chevalier) were reinstated. On 29 May C.C Peterson was granted a transfer from Ponsonby to North Shore, James Thomas Silva from Green Lane senior B to Newton, and Francis Zimmerman from R.V. senior B to Newton. H.M. Moir, A. Laird (Hobsonville), and Oliver Norman Gee (Ponsonby) were registered.

On 12 June J. Sullivan was registered with Ponsonby with a clearance from City, while Walter Ronald Ward was also registered with Ponsonby after a clearance from Richmond. L Rossington was also granted a clearance from New South Wales to join Ponsonby. On 19 June Andrew I. Jost was registered with Newton and John Frederick Rayner with North Shore. J. Greenwood transferred from Richmond reserves to North Shore seniors. Frank Pickrang (Ponsonby) and Peter Mahima (Manukau) were granted conditional transfers to play in Wellington as they were at the Trentham Army Camp. The application was made by the Central club.

On 24 July the league received a letter from the New South Wales rugby league agreeing to the transfer of J. A. Flower from St George (Sydney) to Auckland. J.M. Cornish had his application for reinstatement approved.

On 2 October G.W. Moyles and R.C. Deverall were transferred from South Auckland to the Manukau club with both being eligible to play in the Phelan Shield the following weekend.

References

External links
 Auckland Rugby League Official Site

Auckland Rugby League seasons